Robert Huntley Bell (born 21 February 1946) is an American academic.

Bell attended Dartmouth College in a cohort that included Robert Reich, Frederick Schauer, William Mills Todd, Daniel S. Papp, and William C. Dowling, and graduated in 1967. He pursued graduate study at Harvard University, where he met his wife Ilona Bell, and completed his doctorate in 1972. Bell then joined the Williams College faculty. In 1998, Bell and Paul G. Ashdown won the Robert Foster Cherry Award. The honor was followed in 2004 by an Outstanding Baccalaureate College Professor of the Year award presented by the Carnegie Foundation for the Advancement of Teaching and the Council for the Advancement and Support of Education. Bell was William R. Kenan, Jr. Professor of English from 1994 to 1999, and was reappointed in 2001. He retired from Williams in 2018 as Frederick Latimer Wells Professor of English.

References

1946 births
Living people
Williams College faculty
Dartmouth College alumni
Harvard University alumni